Visitacao Lobo (died 28 June 2014) was an Indian professional footballer who played as a striker. He had played one match for the national team of India in 1970 as well as club football for Sesa and Salgaocar. He also represented Goa in the Santosh Trophy as captain. He is also known for being the first ever player from the state of Goa to play for India national team.

References

People from North Goa district
Indian footballers
Salgaocar FC players
Association football forwards
Footballers from Goa
India international footballers
2014 deaths
1946 births